Saints Rufus and Zosimus (died 107 AD) are 2nd century Christian martyrs venerated by the Roman Catholic and the Eastern Orthodox churches. They lived in Antioch and were martyred with Saint Ignatius of Antioch during the persecution of Christians under the Roman emperor Trajan. They were killed by beasts in the Roman arena. Their feast day is December 18.

Notes

External links
St Rufus Colonnade Statue in St Peter's Square
St Zosimus Colonnade Statue in St Peter's Square

107 deaths
Saints from Roman Syria
2nd-century Christian saints
Year of birth unknown